Bickershaw is a village, effectively a suburb of Abram, within the Metropolitan Borough of Wigan, in Greater Manchester, England. Historically in Lancashire, Bickershaw is 3 miles (4.8 km) south-southeast of Wigan.

The Bickershaw Festival was held here in 1972. 
Today the village is the location of the main entrance/access road to HMP Hindley, a juvenile prison and Young Offenders Institution mainly serving the Northwest UK, although the main building, HMP Hindley, is situated in neighbouring Hindley.

Bickershaw is the birthplace of Lord Martin Dearnaley.

Villages in Greater Manchester
Geography of the Metropolitan Borough of Wigan